Whoever's in New England is the tenth studio album of American country music artist Reba McEntire released on February 10, 1986, through MCA Nashville. It is her first #1 album on the Billboard country albums chart, producing two singles that were #1 country hits: "Whoever's in New England" and "Little Rock".

The album's phenomenal success proved to be a turning point in McEntire's career. It was the singer's first platinum record, and solidified her new superstardom when she was named the 'Entertainer of the Year' by the Country Music Association in autumn 1986.

The album also marked another milestone, McEntire made her first music video for the title track. Eventually, McEntire would become known for her 'mini-movie'-styled music videos.

"I've Seen Better Days" was originally recorded as a duet by George Jones & Tammy Wynette on their 1976 album, Golden Ring.

Promotion

Singles
The title track "Whoever's in New England" served as the album's lead single and was released on January 27, 1986. It reached number 1 on the Billboard Hot Country Songs Chart. "Whoever's in New England" was McEntire's first music video, is considered as one of her signature and breakthrough singles, and she won her first Grammy for it.

"Little Rock" was released as the second single on June 2, 1986. It peaked at number 1 the Billboard Hot Country Songs Chart.

Track listing

Personnel
Vocals
 Reba McEntire – lead and backing vocals 
 Pake McEntire – backing vocals
 Karen Staley – backing vocals

Musicians

 Matt Betton – drums
 Randy "Snuffy" Elmore – fiddle
 Johnny Gimble – fiddle 
 John Hobbs – pianos, keyboards 
 David Hungate – bass guitar

 Weldon Myrick – steel guitar
 Leigh Reynolds – acoustic guitar 
 Billy Joe Walker Jr. – acoustic guitar, electric guitar
 Reggie Young – electric guitar

Production

 Chuck Ainlay – mixing 
 Jimmy Bowen – producer 
 Bob Bullock – overdub recording 
 Mark J. Coddington – second engineer 
 Chip Hardy – overdub recording 
 Russ Martin – second engineer 

 Reba McEntire – producer 
 Glenn Meadows – mastering 
 Keith Odle – second engineer 
 Robbie Ross – second engineer 
 Ron Treat – recording engineer 

Imagery
 Camille Brown – design 
 Simon Levy – art direction 
 Jim McGuire – photography

Studios
 The Castle (Franklin, Tennessee) – mixing location 
 Masterfonics (Nashville, Tennessee) – mastering location

Charts

Weekly charts

Year-end charts

Singles

Certifications and sales

References

1986 albums
Reba McEntire albums
MCA Records albums
Albums produced by Jimmy Bowen